Mohsin Abbas Haider is a Pakistani actor, singer-songwriter, music composer, poet and television presenter. 

He is the recipient of a Lux Style Award from five nominations.

Haider is best known for his acting roles in the successful films Na Maloom Afraad (2014), and Baaji (2019), and in the television productions Mazaaq Raat (2013–2019) and Meri Guriya (2018). 

As a writer, he has co-written the script of the blockbuster film Load Wedding (2018), has written and sung several of his films songs, and has also contributed his vocals for the song Uddi Jaa, that he wrote and also composed, for the musical show Coke Studio (2016).

Life and career
Mohsin Abbas Haider was born on 18 August 1986 to a Punjabi Shia family in Faisalabad, Punjab, Pakistan. 

Haider started his career as radio jockey at a radio station in Faisalabad, and, in 2005, moved to Karachi in order to learn the art of singing and sharpen his skills at the National Academy of Performing Arts (NAPA), formally trained by Ustad Salamat Ali, ultimately launching himself in Punjabi folk music in 2009. 

In 2012 he made his debut song Beparwah Dhola, written and composed by his late maternal uncle Riaz Anjum, while the song video was directed by Nabeel Qureshi. The same year Mohsin was nominated for Best Radio Jockey at the Pakistan Media Awards. He also appeared in several TV shows as a host and as a voice over artist during this time.

In 2014, he appeared in his debut film, the comedy drama Na Maloom Afraad, playing the lead role of quirky guy along with Fahad Mustafa and Javaid Sheikh. 

In 2016, he featured in Coke Studio season 9 and sung Uddi Ja, also written as well composed by himself, which was warmly appreciated by the public. 

In 2017 he appeared in Na Maloom Afraad 2, where he had the lead role as well as writing two songs and singing one, Heerey, while in 2018 he had a special appearance in Load Wedding, for which he wrote the lyrics for two songs, while singing one of them, Munday Lahore De. During the same year, he starred in the drama Meri Guriya, where he plays the antagonist, a child rapist and murderer, and earned critical appreciation for his acting performance. 

From 2013 to 2019 he was a DJ in the Dunya News talk show Mazaaq Raat, where he has, as of April 2018, performed more than 1.500 songs in different genres (ghazals, filmi, naats, etc.). 

In 2019 he sung, wrote and composed a song Na Jaa with his friend Sohail Haider. He won Best Singer of the Year award for this song in Lux Style Awards in 2019. In December 2019, he released a song Rooh written, sung and composed by him.

Haider married Fatema Sohail in 2015 shortly after meeting her. In December 2017, the couple lost their newborn daughter, Mahveen Abbas Haider, after 7 weeks of her birth. In May 2019, the couple had a son, Haider Abbas Mohsin. He was accused of domestic violence against his spouse, and their divorce was finalized in 2019.

Filmography

Television

Films

Singles 
2012 "Bay Parwah Dhola"
2014 "Sapno Ki Maala" (Na Maloom Afraad)
2016 "Uddi Jaa" (Coke Studio season 9)
2017 "Heerey" (Na Maloom Afraad 2) 
2018 "Munday Lahore Day" (Load Wedding) 
2019 "Na Jaa"
2019 "Rooh"
2021 "Kamli" ft. Shyraa Roy''

Awards and nominations

References

External links 
 
 
 

Living people
Pakistani male television actors
Pakistani male film actors
Pakistani television hosts
Pakistani male singers
21st-century Pakistani male actors
National Academy of Performing Arts alumni
People from Faisalabad
Singers from Faisalabad
Male actors from Karachi
Urdu-language singers
Punjabi-language singers
Punjabi people
1986 births